The Cass Sculpture Foundation was a charitable commissioning body based in Goodwood, Sussex, England. The Foundation's 26-acre grounds were home to an ever-changing display of 80 monumental sculptures, all of which were available for sale with the proceeds going directly to artists. The Foundation was a self-sufficient body reliant on sales of commissioned sculpture and visitor entrance fees.   After a review in 2020 the Foundation's Trustees made the decision to wind up the foundation and the park was closed. The Foundation's archive of drawings and maquettes was due to be donated to the nearby Pallant House Gallery.

Founding and funding 
Inspired by their own extensive collection of works from artists such as Elisabeth Frink and Henry Moore, Wilfred and Jeannette Cass embarked on their own journey to establish a revolutionary new model for a sculpture foundation. After initial years of research and visits to other sculpture parks such as the Kröller-Müller in the Netherlands, Louisiana in Denmark and Hakone in Japan the Cass Sculpture Foundation was fully established in 1992.

The Foundation commissioned over 400 important works from both emerging and established artists. Previous commissions include works by Anthony Caro, Tony Cragg, Andy Goldsworthy, Marc Quinn, Kiki Smith, and Rachel Whiteread. The ambition is that the new commissions will act as a catalyst for sculptors, sending them in new directions and creating opportunities elsewhere.

The Foundation marked its twenty-year anniversary in 2012 with the London exhibition, 'Tony Cragg at Exhibition Road'. Coinciding with the Cultural Olympiad, this exhibition displayed 12 works from the British artist, Tony Cragg along Exhibition Road and its accompanying cultural institutions including the V & A, Science and Natural History Museum. 2012 also saw the Foundation launch a number of new international partnerships including the State Hermitage Museum in Russia, The Creative India Foundation in Hyderabad, India and the Yellow River Arts Centre in Yinchuan, China.

Trustees 
 Wilfred Cass - Founder
 Jeannette Cass - Founder
 Mark Cass - Chairman
 Derek Pullen
 Dr Wenny Teo
 Sir Michael Peat — Private secretary to Charles, Prince of Wales
 Earl of March & Kinrara
 David Solomon

Commissioning 
CASS was an authority on the commissioning and exhibiting of large-scale sculpture. The organization's charitable objectives were met through the sale of its sculptures. Once a work was sold CASS split the profit between the artist and the next commission thereby ensuring that it maintained a rolling collection of new works.

The commissioning process could take between 1 and 5 years from conception to completion. During the process the artists contributed a maquette and works on paper to the Foundation's archive for educational purposes

Through meeting fabrication costs, and other additional costs (including installation and marketing), the Foundation funded artists to work on a very large scale making works several meters high. The Foundation encouraged pioneering and experimental works that challenged the creative processes of each artist in order to further their careers.

Artists 
Sculptors displaying works at the Cass Sculpture Foundation have included: Kenneth Armitage, Anthony Caro, Lynn Chadwick, Tony Cragg, Paul Day, Richard Deacon, Elisabeth Frink, Andy Goldsworthy,  Antony Gormley, Thomas Heatherwick, Shirazeh Houshiary, Allen Jones, Phillip King, Bryan Kneale, Eduardo Paolozzi, Marc Quinn, Kiki Smith, Gavin Turk, Rachel Whiteread, Bill Woodrow, Manfred Kielnhofer, Jesse Wine, and David Worthington.

See also 
List of Sculpture Parks

References

External links 

 Cass Sculpture Foundation website 

Sculpture gardens, trails and parks in the United Kingdom
Art museums and galleries in West Sussex
Outdoor sculptures in England
Museums in West Sussex
Goodwood estate
Charities based in West Sussex
Art galleries established in 1992
1992 establishments in England
2020 disestablishments in England